Vorobyov, Vorobiev, Vorobyev and Vorobyova (Воробьёва; feminine) is a common Russian surname derived from the Russian word воробей (vorobey, "sparrow").

People with this surname include:
 Aleksandr Vorobyov (born 1962), Soviet football player
 Aleksandra Vorobyova (born 1989), Russian singer
 Alexey Vorobyov (born 1988), Russian singer and actor
 Andrei Vorobyov (born 1982), Russian footballer
 Andrey Yuryevich Vorobyov (born 1970), governor of Moscow Oblast
 Andrey Vorobiev (born 1985), Russian politician
 Arkady Vorobyov (1924–2012), Russian middle-heavyweight
 Dmitry Vorobiev (born 1985), Russian ice hockey player
 Grigory Vorobiev (1929–2019), Soviet/Russian sports physician
 Irina Vorobieva (1958–2022), Soviet pair skater
 Ivan Vorobyov (disambiguation)
 Ivan Alekseyevich Vorobyov (1921–1991), Soviet Air force commander, twice Hero of the Soviet Union
 Ivan Vorobyov (judoka)
 Ivan Grigoryevich Vorobyov  (1920–1965), Hero of the Soviet Union
 Ivan Ivanovich Vorobyov (1908–1967), Hero of the Soviet Union
 Julia Vorobieva (born 1974), Azerbaijani figure skater
 Konstantin Dmitrievich Vorobyov (1919–1975), a Soviet writer
 Marie Vorobieff (1892–1984), Russian painter
 Maksim Vorobyov (born 1976), Russian businessman and investor
 Maksim Vorobyov (1787–1855), Russian painter
 Mikhail Vorobyev (1896–1957), Soviet marshal of the corps of engineers
 Mikhail Vorobyev (ice hockey) (born 1997), Russian ice hockey player
 Nikolai Vorobyov (disambiguation)
 Nikolai Nikolayevich Vorobyov (mathematician) (1925–1955), Soviet and Russian mathematician
 Nikolai Vasilievich Vorobyov (born 1960), Russian football coach and former player
 Pavel Vorobyev (born 1982), Russian ice hockey player
 Pyotr Vorobyov (born 1949), Russian ice hockey player and coach
 Roman Vorobyov (born 1984), Russian footballer
 Valeria Vorobieva (born 1988), Russian figure skater
 Valeriy Vorobyov (born 1970), Ukrainian footballer
 Vladimir Vorobiev (born 1972), Russian ice hockey player
 Vladimir Vorobyov (1876–1937), Soviet anatomist and academician
 Yakov Vorobyov (1885–1919), Russian revolutionary
 Youri Vorobyov, Soviet-born coach of acrobatic gymnastics
 Yuri Vorobyov (born 1948), Russian politician

See also 
 Sparrow Hills, aka Vorobyovy Gory, a locality in Moscow, Russia

References 
 

Russian-language surnames
Surnames from nicknames